The Town of Pagosa Springs (Ute language: Pagwöösa, Navajo language: Tó Sido Háálį́) is a home rule municipality that is the county seat, the most populous community, and the only incorporated municipality in Archuleta County, Colorado, United States. The population was 1,727 at the 2010 census. Approximately 65 percent of the land in Archuleta County is either San Juan National Forest, Weminuche and South San Juan Wilderness areas, or Southern Ute Indian reservation land.

Pagosa Springs and the surrounding county are both experiencing a substantial influx of second-home owners; a 2006 property assessment indicates that 60% of area private properties are owned by non-residents.

This combination of high desert plateau and the Rocky Mountains to the north and east creates an unusually mild climate, especially in the summer months. Pagosa sees around 300 days of sun each year, as well as four distinct seasons.

The town is located in the upper San Juan Basin, surrounded by the  San Juan National Forest, and adjacent to the largest wilderness area in the state of Colorado, the Weminuche Wilderness.

The town is named for a system of sulfur springs, Pagosa hot springs, located there, which includes the world's deepest geothermal hot spring. The "Mother" spring feeds primitive and developed hot springs located on the upper banks of the San Juan River, which flows through town. The primitive springs are freely accessible to the public, but are generally not for entering or interacting with because of the extreme water temperature. Developed springs feed soaking pools that are hosted by three privately-owned soaking locations within town.

History
Local indigenous people used the hot springs for centuries; the area was considered "sacred ground". In Navajo cosmology, Pagosa Springs is the place where the People (Diné) emerged from their Fourth World underground to the Fifth World, this one, as Aileen O'Bryan records in The Dîné: Origin Myths of the Navaho Indians. In 1859, a white settler "discovered" the springs and exploited them. In 1881, a bathhouse was first built there for paying customers.

The Ute people called the sulfur-rich mineral springs , which is commonly translated in modern documents as "healing waters"; a Ute elder once translated the phrase as "water that has a bad smell."

After the Civil War, the United States government considered building a convalescent hospital in Pagosa Springs. However, the hospital project was cancelled, and the lands platted by the U.S. Army were sold to private parties who capitalized on the thermal mineral springs.  Along the banks of the San Juan river, simple wooden bathhouses were constructed.

In the late 1880s, Dr. Mary Winter Fisher ventured west from Chicago to found a medical and healing practice in Pagosa Springs. The medical center in the town is named in her honor.

In the 1930s, Cora Woods built a geothermal swimming pool and several small cabins on the Northeast corner of land she purchased from Bill Lynn, a local entrepreneur. There were a total of 23 cabins with no electricity, dirt floors, wood stoves, and oak iceboxes. In the 1950s, the Giordano family purchased the property from Cora Woods. The Giordanos were European coal miners who had settled in the Walsenburg, Colorado area. They dug additional geothermal wells, and built an enclosed bathhouse next to the thermal water swimming pool.

In the 1980s, Pagosa Springs received federal funding from the Department of Energy to drill two geothermal wells to heat buildings in the small downtown area of the town. In the 1990s, the town built a new pipeline and municipal bridge to deliver mineral springs water to a new resort.

Geography
The San Juan River flows through the middle of town.

The area around Pagosa Springs has numerous large waterfalls, including Treasure Falls to the east of town off of Hwy 160 just past the Wolf Creek Pass summit.

Climate

Demographics

As of the census of 2000, there were 1,591 people, 633 households, and 415 families residing in the town. The racial makeup of the town was 74.61% White, 0.50% African American, 2.20% Native American, 0.25% Asian, 18.73% from other races, and 3.71% from two or more races. Hispanic or Latino of any race were 43.18% of the population.

There were 633 households, out of which 32.4% had children under the age of 18 living with them, 46.1% were married couples living together, 13.6% had a female householder with no husband present, and 34.4% were non-families. 27.8% of all households were made up of individuals, and 10.3% had someone living alone who was 65 years of age or older. The average household size was 2.48 and the average family size was 3.07.

In the town, the population was spread out, with 27.6% under the age of 18, 9.4% from 18 to 24, 26.9% from 25 to 44, 24.8% from 45 to 64, and 11.3% who were 65 years of age or older. The median age was 37 years. For every 100 females, there were 96.4 males. For every 100 females age 18 and over, there were 94.3 males.

The median income for a household in the town was $29,469, and the median income for a family was $33,831. Males had a median income of $24,125 versus $21,406 for females. The per capita income for the town was $15,355. About 11.9% of families and 14.1% of the population were below the poverty line, including 14.6% of those under age 18 and 21.1% of those age 65 or over.

Education
Archuleta County School District 50-JT operates the community's public schools. Pagosa Springs High School is the comprehensive high school.

Recreation
Other recreational activities in the area include downhill and cross country skiing at nearby Wolf Creek ski area, and snowmobiling in the surrounding National Forest. Summertime activities include fishing, hiking, and rafting. The area is also a popular destination for hunters, who harvest elk, deer, and other game animals.

In popular culture
"Downtown Pagosa Springs" was the final destination for a duo of truckers in the 1975 country song "Wolf Creek Pass" by C. W. McCall.

Gallery

Notable residents 
 Ursala Hudson (Tlingit), Chilkat and Ravenstail weaver

See also

Outline of Colorado
Index of Colorado-related articles
State of Colorado
Colorado cities and towns
Colorado municipalities
Colorado counties
Archuleta County, Colorado

References

External links

Visit Pagosa Springs, The official website for Pagosa Springs visitor information
Town of Pagosa Springs, The official website for The Town of Pagosa Springs
The Pagosa Springs Journal, daily news
Pagosa.com, commercial site
Pagosa Springs Community Development Corporation
Archuleta School District #50 JT

Towns in Archuleta County, Colorado
Towns in Colorado
County seats in Colorado